Return of the Devil's Son, is the third posthumous album by American rapper Big L. It was released on November 23, 2010, through SMC Recordings. Officially put together by L's brother Donald Phinazee, Return of the Devil's Son is a collection of previously unreleased material, including early demo tracks, outtakes from Lifestylez ov da Poor & Dangerous and The Big Picture together with a few freestyles and new remixes. It features guest appearances from Royal Flush and Kool G Rap, as well as production by Showbiz, Lord Finesse, DJ Premier, Large Professor, Domingo, amongst others.

Track listing

Charts

References

2010 albums
Big L albums
SMC Recordings albums